Peter Millar (21 April 1951 – 17 June 2013) was a Scottish footballer who played as a defender or midfielder.

Millar is best known for his time at Motherwell where he made 178 league appearances from 1972 to 1979; he also played for Arbroath, Dunfermline Athletic and Dundee before rounding off his career in the United States where he played for Phoenix Inferno and Cleveland Force.

Millar died on 17 June 2013, having been suffering from a brain tumour.

References

External links 
Dunfermline Athletic FC obituary
Motherwell FC obituary

1951 births
2013 deaths
Scottish footballers
Sportspeople from Wishaw
Scottish Junior Football Association players
Scottish Football League players
Scottish Football League representative players
Association football midfielders
Association football defenders
Forth Wanderers F.C. players
Arbroath F.C. players
Dunfermline Athletic F.C. players
Motherwell F.C. players
Dundee F.C. players
Phoenix Inferno players
Cleveland Force (original MISL) players
Scottish expatriate footballers
Expatriate soccer players in the United States
Deaths from brain tumor
Deaths from cancer in Scotland
Footballers from North Lanarkshire